This is a list of motorcycles manufactured by Italian manufacturer Laverda.

1950-1987
During this period Laverda was under the control of the Laverda family.

American Eagle models
From 1968 to 1970 Laverdas were imported to the US by John McCormack under the American Eagle brand.

1987-1990
Laverda was run as a government backed worker's cooperative. The company name was changed to Nuova Moto Laverda in 1989.

1990-1993
Laverda was taken in 1990 over by Gruppo Zanini, who formed a partnership with the Japanese Shinken corporation. Zanini were in financial trouble by 1983 and the Italian government intervened.

1993-2000
Laverda was taken over by a group of investors headed by Francesco Tognon and the company was renemed I.Mo.La. SpA (International Moto Laverda). Production was move from Breganze to Zanè, 6 miles to the west.

2000-2004
Aprilia purchased Laverda in 2000. Whilst there was some production of Laverda motorcycles, the brand was mainly used on brought in scoters and quads. Aprilia was purchased in 2004 by Piaggio who dropped the brand.

References

External links

Laverda motorcycles
Lists of motorcycles by brand